The mule Idaho Gem (born May 4, 2003) is the first cloned equine and first cloned mule.

He is the result of the collaboration of Dr. Gordon Woods and Dr. Dirk Vanderwall of the Northwest Equine Reproduction Laboratory at the University of Idaho and Dr. Ken White of Utah State University. Two more healthy mule clones were born in succeeding months as a result of Project Idaho, Utah Pioneer on June 9, and Idaho Star on July 27. The project was largely financed by Post Falls, Idaho, businessman Don Jacklin, who also served as president of the American Mule Racing Association. Idaho Gem and Idaho Star were transported to trainers in 2005 to prepare them for racing in 2006. Idaho Gem and Idaho Star both won their first races on June 3, 2006, separate trial races for the Humboldt Futurity during the Winnemucca, Nev., Mule Races, Show and Draft Horse Challenge, June 3 and 4. In the June 4 futurity, Idaho Gem finished third and Idaho Star finished seventh. Idaho Gem won his next race at the San Joaquin Fair in Stockton, June 21. His time of 20.724 seconds over the 350-yard course was the fastest time by a 3-year-old mule through the end of July, the halfway point in the mule racing season. Idaho Gem also collected two seconds in photo finishes with the racing mule Out of My League. The total margin of victory between the two mules in the two races was .043 seconds. Through his first six races, Idaho Gem collected two firsts, two seconds a third and a fourth.

On June 4, 2006, Idaho Gem finished 3rd in the Winnemucca Mule Race. This was the first competition between cloned and natural-born mules.

, Idaho Gem was owned by Jacklin, who was preparing to have him trained for gymkhana events. The mule was reported to be in good health.

References

External links
Richard Black, Cloning first for horse family, BBC News, May 29, 2003

2003 animal births
Cloned animals
University of Idaho
Individual mules